The Luigi G. Napolitano Award is presented every year at the International Astronautical Congress. Luigi Gerardo Napolitano was an engineer, scientist and professor.

The award has been presented annually since 1993, to a young scientist, below 30 years of age, who has contributed significantly to the advancement of the aerospace science and has given a paper at the International Astronautical Congress on the contribution.

The Luigi G. Napolitano Award is donated by the Napolitano family and it consists of the Napolitano commemorative medal and a certificate of citation, and is presented by the Education Committee of the IAF.

The International Academy of Astronautics awards the Luigi Napolitano Book Award annually.

Winners
1993 Shin-ichi Nishizawa 
1994 Ralph D. Lorenz 
1995 O.G.Liepack 
1996 W. Tang 
1997 G.W.R. Frenken 
1998 Michael Donald Ingham
1999 Chris Blanksby  
2000 Frederic Monnaie 
2001 Noboru Takeichi 
2002 Stefano Ferreti 
2003 Veronica de Micco 
2004 Julie Bellerose 
2005 Nicola Baggio 
2006 Carlo Menon 
2007 Paul Williams 
2008 Giuseppe Del Gaudio 
2009 Daniel Kwom 
2010 Andrew Flasch 
2011 Nishchay Mhatre 
2012 Valerio Carandente 
2013 Sreeja Nag 
2014 Alessandro Golkar 
2015 Koki Ho 
2016 Melissa Mirino 
2017 Akshata Krishnamurthy 
2018 Peter Z. Schulte 
2019 Hao Chen

See also

 List of engineering awards
 List of physics awards
 List of space technology awards

External links
International Astronautical Federation
Award winners IAA

Napolitano
Napolitano
Space-related awards